Guruji Oru Vakku is a 1985 Indian Malayalam-language film directed by Rajan Sankaradi and written by Venu Nagavally. The film stars Mohanlal, Madhu, Nedumudi Venu and Ratheesh. The film has songs composed by Jerry Amaldev and background score by Johnson.

Plot

Cast
Madhu as Guruji
Mohanlal as Unni
Nedumudi Venu as Charly
Ratheesh as Gopu
Manochithra as Meera
Seema as Betty
Uma Bharani as Latha
Sukumari as Betty's Mother
Sankaradi 
T. P. Madhavan as Hotel Manager

Soundtrack
The music was composed by Jerry Amaldev and the lyrics were written by Bichu Thirumala.

References

External links
 

1985 films
1980s Malayalam-language films
Films scored by Jerry Amaldev
Films directed by Rajan Sankaradi